Rock On is the second live album by the Australian rock band The Screaming Jets released in 2005. It was also released as a DVD (Rock On) with this disc as a bonus disc.

Track listing
"Reputation" – 2:54
"Black and White" – 2:47
"Tunnel" – 4:42
"Heart of the Matter" – 2:51
"Higher With You" – 2:41
"Realise" – 2:58
"I Need Your Love" – 3:57
"Blue Sashes" – 3:42
"Pablo" – 3:01
"Shine Over Me" – 4:04
"October Grey" – 4:03
"Sad Song" – 3:38
"Helping Hand" – 5:14
"Right Place, Wrong Time" – 3:21
"Another Day" – 2:50
"Living in England" – 2:07
"Needle to the Red" – 3:36
"Better" – 5:00
"C'mon" – 3:15

Credits
Bass – Paul Woseen
Drums – Col Hatchman
Guitar – Grant Walmsley, Izzy Osmanovic
Vocals – Dave Gleeson

Release history

References

The Screaming Jets albums
2005 live albums
Live albums by Australian artists